Toplice is a South Slavic word for spa and it may refer to:

Dolenjske Toplice, town and a municipality in Slovenia near Novo Mesto
Grand Hotel Toplice
Istarske Toplice, thermal health resort in the central part of Istria, Croatia, 11 km southwest of Buzet (Pinguente)
Krapinske Toplice, village and municipality in Krapina-Zagorje county in Croatia
Medijske Toplice, spa located in the town of Izlake in central Slovenia
Moravske Toplice, town and a municipality in Slovenia
Rimske Toplice, a settlement in the Municipality of Laško in eastern Slovenia
Šmarješke Toplice, town and a municipality in Slovenia
Stubičke Toplice, village and municipality in Krapina-Zagorje county in Croatia
Toplice, Croatia, village near Jastrebarsko
Varaždinske Toplice, town in Croatia in Varaždin county